The eastern mulch-slider (Lerista fragilis)  is a species of skink found in Queensland and Tasmania in Australia.

References

Lerista
Reptiles described in 1876
Taxa named by Albert Günther